The Conan Chronicles II is a collection of fantasy novels written by Robert Jordan featuring the sword and sorcery hero Conan the Barbarian, created by Robert E. Howard.  The book was published in 1997 by Legend Books and collects three novels originally published by Tor Books.

Contents
 Conan the Magnificent
 Conan the Triumphant, (includes the essay, "Conan the Indestructible", by L. Sprague de Camp)
 Conan the Destroyer

References

1997 British novels
British fantasy novels
Conan the Barbarian books
Legend Books books